Vladimir Polkanov is a Moldovan para table tennis player. He represented Moldova at the 1996 Summer Paralympics in Atlanta, United States and he won a bronze medal in the men's singles 8 event.

He also competed at the 1992 Summer Paralympics in Barcelona, Spain as part of the Unified Team.

References

External links 
 

Living people
Year of birth missing (living people)
Place of birth missing (living people)
Table tennis players at the 1992 Summer Paralympics
Table tennis players at the 1996 Summer Paralympics
Medalists at the 1996 Summer Paralympics
Paralympic bronze medalists for Moldova
Paralympic table tennis players of Moldova
Moldovan table tennis players
Paralympic medalists in table tennis
20th-century Moldovan people